Hans Tugi (c. 1460–1519) was a Swiss organ builder. He was born in Basel, son of a gunsmith. He matriculated at the University of Basel in 1476-77. By the turn of the century, Tugi was one of the most important organ builders in Switzerland and south-west Germany. Places he worked at and built instruments for include the following:

 Cathedral of Konstanz (1489–90, possibly also later)
 Mantua Cathedral (1503?)
 Grossmünster of Zurich (1505–07)
 Mainz Cathedral (1514)
 Münster of Berne (1517–19)

He also worked for many years in Basel, Colmar and other cities.

See also 
 List of organ builders

References 
 Manfred Schuler. "Tugi, Hans", Grove Music Online, ed. L. Macy, grovemusic.com  (subscription access).

Swiss pipe organ builders
Year of birth uncertain
1519 deaths
People from Basel-Stadt